John Paul Marino "J. P." Foschi (pronounced FAH-shee) (born May 19, 1982 in Queens, New York) is a former American football tight end. He was signed by the New York Jets as an undrafted free agent in 2004. He played college football at Georgia Tech.

Foschi has also been a member of the Denver Broncos, Minnesota Vikings, Oakland Raiders, Kansas City Chiefs, and Buffalo Bills.

Early years
Foschi is from Long Island, New York. He attended Friends Academy Middle School in Locust Valley, NY and Chaminade High School. in Mineola, New York and was a four-year letterman in football and basketball.

Personal life
John Paul is the son of Margaret and Robert Foschi. His father graduated from Columbia University in 1976 where he played basketball and studied engineering. J. P. has two sisters who were Division I college swimmers, one of whom is Jessica Foschi.

References

External links
Georgia Tech Yellow Jackets bio

1982 births
Living people
Sportspeople from Queens, New York
Players of American football from New York City
American football tight ends
American football fullbacks
Georgia Tech Yellow Jackets football players
New York Jets players
Denver Broncos players
Minnesota Vikings players
Oakland Raiders players
Kansas City Chiefs players
Cincinnati Bengals players
Buffalo Bills players
Chaminade High School alumni